Hadromyia aldrichi is a species of hoverfly in the family Syrphidae.

Description
"Very similar to opacus but more robust, head obviously broader than 
high; abdomen brilliant bronze, with the pile more golden. "
 
"Female: Frons depressed, dull aeneous black, somewhat reddish above  antennae, with dark brown pile and very narrow whitish pollinose stripes  along eyes. Dorsum of thorax sub-shining black, with dark brown pile;  meso-pleurae with rather long golden pile; posterior margin of scutellum  and post-alar calli with yellow pile. Abdomen banded similarly to opacus.  Fore femora dark on outer side, yellow on inner side; middle femora al-  most entirely yellow; hind femora yellow, a dark band around the middle;  the rest of legs yellow, except the last two joints of all the tarsi. Wings  infuscated anteriorly, darkest along the veins. Length: Body about 12-  14 mm., wing 11-12 mm. "  from origial description  
The male genitalia were figured by Metcalf.

Distribution
Canada, United States.

References

Eristalinae
Insects described in 1916
Diptera of North America
Hoverflies of North America
Taxa named by Raymond Corbett Shannon